WNCI (97.9 FM) (branded 97.9 WNCI) is a commercial contemporary hit radio station licensed to Columbus, Ohio, serving the Columbus metro area. Owned by iHeartMedia, it serves as the flagship station for the syndicated "Dave & Jimmy" morning show.  In middays, it carries the syndicated "On Air with Ryan Seacrest." The WNCI studios are located on West Fifth Avenue on Columbus' west side.  

WNCI's transmitter is atop One Nationwide Plaza in the city's downtown. In addition to a standard analog transmission, WNCI broadcasts over two HD Radio channels, and streams online via iHeartRadio.

The station has an effective radiated power (ERP) of 175,000 watts, while the current maximum for Ohio radio stations is 50,000 watts.  It is permitted this higher output because it is grandfathered from before the date when the FCC set limits for FM stations.  There are only six FM stations in the United States that operate with more power.

History

Classical and Easy Listening
The station signed on the air as WRFD-FM in .Broadcasting Yearbook 1990 page B-239, Broadcasting & Cable  It had a classical music format, sharing studios with AM sister station WRFD 880 AM, east of Powell, Ohio. In early 1967, management changed the call sign to WNCI-FM to match its corporate ownership, Nationwide Communications, Inc. The call letter switch marked a change in programming from primarily classical music.  

In mid 1968, WNCI began programming "The Young Sound" format, supplied by CBS Radio, mostly vocal-oriented easy listening.  In 1972, WNCI moved to the sixth floor of the new Scot's Inn, later the Carousel Inn, at 4900 Sinclair Road. Since that time, the studios of WNCI have been relocated to various places in the Columbus area, including the Nationwide Building, The Continent, Broadcast Lake (a former quarry overlooked by several Clear Channel radio studios and the television studios of WSYX), and the current location at 2323 West Fifth Avenue.

Top 40
WNCI began its Top 40 programming in 1970, although the station also broadcast an evening "progressive rock" album-based program beginning in the fall of 1969.  From 1979 to 1982, the station attempted a full service, adult contemporary music format to compete with WTVN 610 AM, adding a five-person news staff.  Its slogan at the time was "The Best Is At The Center," playing on its location on the FM dial.  The full-service format was abandoned in 1982 and the station returned to playing Top 40 hits.

In June 1993, WNCI again morphed into a Hot AC-leaning station to compete with adult contemporary rival Sunny 95 WSNY. This lasted for nearly a year before WNCI reverted to a CHR/Pop formatted-direction. As of 2010, WNCI competes with 107.5 WCKX, which shifted from Mainstream Urban to Rhythmic Contemporary, since WNCI tends to be more mainstream, conservative, and still at times, leans slightly towards Hot AC.  WNCI's popularity has meant that iHeartMedia has had no need to convert the station to its KISS-FM branding, although its current logo features the style and font of most KISS-FM stations.

Previously, the station was owned by Jacor Communications Incorporated. Jacor acquired the assets of Nationwide Communications in 1997 for $620 million. WNCI was once the flagship station for the 17-radio-station-group Nationwide Communications, a division of the Nationwide Mutual Insurance Company (where its call letters derive). Nationwide continues to be a broad advertiser with the station.  Although WRFD is still broadcasting, it is now owned by Salem Communications.

References

External links

Contemporary hit radio stations in the United States
Nationwide Communications
Radio stations established in 1961
NCI
IHeartMedia radio stations